Goas may refer to:

People
 Edgardo Goás (born 1989), Puerto Rican volleyball player
 Urko Pardo Goas (born 1983), Belgian football player

Places
 Goas, Tarn-et-Garonne, Occitanie, France
 Lamothe-Goas, Gers, France

Other
 Goa (antelope), relatively small antelopes

See also

 
 
 Goa (disambiguation)